William Arthur Reiss (born May 4, 1976) is an American animator, storyboard artist, and writer.

Career
Reiss first worked on the Nickelodeon series SpongeBob SquarePants as an assistant storyboard artist in Season 1 as Bill Reiss, then got promoted to a writer and storyboard artist in Season 2 while still being called "Bill Reiss" by other crew members. Reiss left the show during the fourth season in 2005, but briefly returned in 2009 to storyboard the main title for the 10th Anniversary special, Truth or Square.

After SpongeBob, he went to work for Cartoon Network and worked as a storyboard artist for certain shows at that network. He is best known for teaming up with former SpongeBob writer C.H. Greenblatt to serve as creative director on his cartoon Chowder.

They later worked as directors for Fish Hooks, which he co-developed with Alex Hirsch for Noah Z. Jones for Disney Channel. After Fish Hooks, he worked on Mickey Mouse as a writer, storyboard artist and director.

In 2016, Reiss worked on C.H. Greenblatt's new series for Nickelodeon, Harvey Beaks.

Filmography

Television

Film

Notes

References

External links
 

Living people
American storyboard artists
Creative directors
1976 births